GDP, short for gross domestic product, is the basic measure of a country's overall economic output.

GDP may also refer to:
 GDP (chemotherapy), a chemotherapy treatment regimen
 GDP (musician), an American hip hop musician from New Jersey
 Giant depolarizing potentials, the first type of electrical activity of developing brain
 Gibraltar Defence Police, a civil police force which guards and enforces law on Ministry of Defence installations in Gibraltar
 Gidea Park railway station, National Rail station code GDP
  Good distribution practice, the guidelines for the proper distribution of medicinal products for human use
 Good documentation practice, pharmaceutical description of standards by which documents are created and maintained
 Ground delay program, a traffic flow initiative for aviation in the United States
 Guanosine diphosphate, a nucleotide
 Grand Ducal Police, the national police force of Luxembourg

GdP may refer to:
 , a trade union of police employees in Germany